In traditional Chinese medicine, a deer penis (Vietnamese: Lộc pín) is said to have important therapeutic properties.

Purported properties
In Angang, Taiwan, women are reported to consume deer penis during pregnancy as it is said to have a fattening effect and to make the mother and child stronger.

The Mayans were also known to extract the penis of the deer and roast it. Hippocrates recommended consuming deer penis to resolve sexual difficulties.

During the 2008 Summer Olympics in China, the country banned deer penis wine, turtle blood and angelica root supplements from athletes' diets. This is because according to traditional Chinese medicine, deer penis, especially if ingested while soaked in alcohol (deer penis wine), is an effective remedy for athletic injuries. Chinese Olympic officials advised national athletes not to take the traditional remedy because it may contain the banned herb Ephedra. It joined steroids and various stimulants on the list of banned substances. When consumed, a deer penis or tiger penis is also said to enhance strength, and is thought by some to be an aphrodisiac.

Availability
Like turtle's blood and penis, deer penis is one of the "delicacies" served in large jars in Snake Alley, Taipei. It is also served on the Chinese mainland in restaurants such as the Guo Li Zhuang.
Deer penis wine can be sold at $12 a glass and often as high as $455 for a two-litre bottle. Deer-antler wine, known as Lurongjiu, is also said to enhance sexual potency in men and to have a warming effect, aiding the joints. A deer's penis, turtle's penis, or bull's penis is consumed in restaurants and is known in Singapore to be offered as a soup delicacy.

Popular culture
Powdered deer penis is mentioned in the 1996 Steven Seagal film The Glimmer Man during the scene where Seagal and Keenen Ivory Wayans enter a Chinese herbal store.

Weebam-Na, a miscellaneous character in The Elder Scrolls IV: Oblivion, mentions powdered deer penis when asked about Leyawiin, the city he resides in.

Deer penis is mentioned in the 2009 episode of The Office "Double Date" when Dwight corrects Michael's statement calling fish sticks an aphrodisiac: "you're thinking of deer penis," Dwight replies.

In season 1 episode 5 of The League, Ruxin and Taco go to Chinatown to buy "3 Penis Wine", involving the infusion of deer penises, dog penises, and snake penises. However, the real "Three-Penis Wine" contains a fusion of seal, dog and deer penis.

See also
 Penis#Deer
 Self-anointing in animals#Elk
 Sexual behavior of deer
 Pizzle
 Koro (medicine)
 Tiger penis
 Elephant penis
 Deer blood

References

Bibliography
 Pérez, William, Noelia Vazquez, and Rodolfo Ungerfeld. "Gross anatomy of the male genital organs of the pampas deer (Ozotoceros bezoarticus, Linnaeus 1758)." Anatomical science international 88.3 (2013): 123–129.
 Stewart, David W. "Letters to the Editor: Male Genitalia of Red Deer (Cer Vus Elaphus)." New Zealand veterinary journal 31.7 (1983): 122-122.
 
 Mesang-Nalley, Marlene, Henderiana Belli, and Ristika Handarini. "Anatomy and Morphometry of Timor Deer (Cervus timorensis) Stags Reproductive Organs."
 Yueqiu, Guo, et al. "Identification of Deer Testes and Penis and its Counterfeiting Products by Immuno-agglutination Testing." CHINESE PHARMACEUTICAL AFFAIRS 2 (2000): 017.
 Vidyadaran, M. K., et al. "Male genital organs and accessory glands of the lesser mouse deer, Tragulus javanicus." Journal of mammalogy (1999): 199–204.
 
 Marburger, R. G., R. M. Robinson, and J. W. Thomas. "Genital hypoplasia of white-tailed deer." Journal of Mammalogy 48.4 (1967): 674–676.
 
 
 
 
 
 
 
 
 
 

Mammal penis
Deer
Traditional Chinese medicine
Chinese alcoholic drinks
Chinese cuisine